This page details football records and statistics in Turkey.

Süper Lig 
Records in this section refer to Süper Lig from its introduction in 1959 through to the present.

Club records

Titles

 Most titles:
 22, Galatasaray
 Most consecutive titles:
4, Galatasaray (1996–2000)
3, Galatasaray (1971–1973)
3, Trabzonspor (1979–1981)
3, Beşiktaş (1990–1992)
2, Beşiktaş (1957–1958; 1966–1967; 2016–2017)
2, Galatasaray (1962–1963; 1987–1988; 1993–1994; 2012–2013; 2018–2019)
2, Fenerbahçe (1964–1965; 1974–1975; 2004–2005)

Most points per season
 16 Matches (2 points per win)
 28, Fenerbahçe (1959)
 38 Matches (2 points per win)
 65, Beşiktaş (1959–60)
 42 Matches (2 points per win)
 68, Beşiktaş (1962–63)
 30 Matches (2 points per win)
 48, Beşiktaş (1965–66)
 32 Matches (2 points per win)n 
 49, Fenerbahçe (1967–68)
 34 Matches (2 points per win)
 50, Trabzonspor (1983–84)
 50, Fenerbahçe (1984–85)
 50, Beşiktaş (1984–85)
 36 Matches (2 points per win)
 56, Beşiktaş (1985–86)
 56, Galatasaray (1985–86)
 38 Matches (3 points per win)
 90, Galatasaray (1987–88)
 36 Matches (3 points per win)
 93, Fenerbahçe (1988–89)
 30 Matches (3 points per win)
 76, Beşiktaş (1991–92)
 34 Matches (3 points per win)
 85, Beşiktaş (2002–03)
 40 Matches (3 points per win)
 86, Galatasaray (2011–12)

Top flight appearances
 Most appearances: 62, joint record
 Beşiktaş (1959–present)
 Fenerbahçe (1959–present)
 Galatasaray (1959–present)

Rounds completed in leading position
 Most rounds:
 556, Galatasaray 
 556, Fenerbahçe 
 412, Beşiktaş
 208, Trabzonspor
As of 27 July 2020

Representation
 Most participants from a city:
 In the 1962–63 season, Istanbul had 11 entrants in the top-flight: Beşiktaş, Beykoz, Beyoğlu, Fenerbahçe, Feriköy, Galatasaray, İstanbulspor, Karagümrük, Kasımpaşa, Vefa, and Yeşildirek.

Wins
 Most wins in a season, joint record
 29, Beşiktaş 1959–60 (38 matches)
 29, Fenerbahçe 1988–89 (36 matches)
 Most consecutive wins
 14, Galatasaray (12th week 2022-23 to 25th week 2022-23)
 Most consecutive home wins
 25, Galatasaray (34th week 2000–01 to 16th week 2002–03)
 Most consecutive away wins
 12, Fenerbahçe (18th week 2010–11 to 6th week 2011–12)
 Fewest wins in a season, joint record
 2, Diyarbakırspor, 1981–82 (32 matches)
 2, Konyaspor, 1992–93 (30 matches)
 2, Zeytinburnu, 1996–97 (34 matches)
 2, Adanaspor, 2000–01 (34 matches)
 2, Ankaragücü, 2011–12 (34 matches)

Draws
 Most draws in a season
 18, Ankaragücü, 1982–83 (34 matches)
 Fewest draws in a season, joint record
 2, Fenerbahçe, 1991–92 (30 matches)
 2, Eskişehirspor, 1995–96 (34 matches)
 2, Fenerbahçe, 2004–05 (34 matches)

Losses
 Most losses in a season
 28, Kardemir Karabükspor, 2017–18 (34 matches)
 Fewest defeats in a season
 0, Galatasaray, 1985–86 (36 matches)
 0, Beşiktaş, 1991–92 (30 matches)

Goals
 Most goals scored in a season
 105, Galatasaray, 1962–63 (42 matches)
 103, Fenerbahçe, 1988–89 (36 matches)
 Fewest goals scored in a season, joint record
 6, İstanbulspor, 1959 (14 matches)
 Most goals conceded in a season
 91, Adanaspor, 2000–01 (34 matches)
 Fewest goals conceded in a season
 6, Fenerbahçe, 1969–70 (30 matches)
 Best goal difference in a season
 +76, Fenerbahçe, 1988–89 (36 matches)
 +70, Galatasaray, 1962–63 (42 matches)
 Worst goal difference in a season
 -66, Kardemir Karabükspor, 2017–18 (34 matches)
 Most consecutive games scoring
 39, Galatasaray, (9 August 1997 – 21 November 1998)

Scorelines
 Most goals scored in a single game
 12, Fenerbahçe 8–4 Gaziantepspor, 1991–92

 Biggest home win

 Beşiktaş 10–0 Adana Demirspor, 1989–90

 Biggest away win
 Ankaragücü 0–8 Galatasaray, 1992–93

Unbeaten
 Longest unbeaten run
 48, Beşiktaş, 26th week 1990–91 to 13th week 1992–93
 Longest home unbeaten run
 90, Trabzonspor 10th week 1975–76 to 8th week 1981–82
 Longest away unbeaten run
 40, Galatasaray, 19th week 1997–98 to 31st week 1999–2000

Attendance
 Highest attendance
76,127 Beşiktaş JK vs Galatasaray SK (at Atatürk Olympic Stadium 22 September 2013)
71,334 Galatasaray SK vs Fenerbahçe SK (at Atatürk Olympic Stadium 21 September 2003)

Individual records

Youngest players

All-time most appearances

As of 15 May 2021. (Bold denotes players still playing in the league).

Goals
 Youngest goalscorer

Most consecutive matches scored in: 9 matches,
Metin Oktay for Galatasaray S.K., 1962–63
Saffet Sancaklı for Kocaelispor, 1995–96

All-time top scorers

Goalkeepers
Longest consecutive run without conceding a goal: 12 games (1,112 minutes), Şenol Güneş

Most championships by manager

Most championships by player 
(at least 5 titles)

Turkish Football Championship (1924–1951) 
Records and statistics in this section refer to the former Turkish Football Championship that was held from 1924 to 1951.

Titles

 Most titles: 3, joint record
 Fenerbahçe
 Harp Okulu

Appearances
 Most appearances: 8
 Beşiktaş (1924, 1934, 1941, 1942, 1945, 1946, 1950, 1951)

Finals
 Most wins: 2
 Fenerbahçe (1933, 1935)

 Most defeats: 3
 Altınordu (1927, 1932, 1935)

 Biggest win:
 İzmirspor 0–8 Fenerbahçe (1933)

 Most appearances: 3
 Fenerbahçe (1933, 1935, 1940)

Scorelines
 Highest scoring games
 18, Eskişehir Tayyare İdman Yurdu 17–1 Kütahya Türkspor (1932, Group stage)
 15, Eskişehir Tayyare Yurdu 14–1 Giresun Hilâl Spor (1927, Preliminary round)
 15, Altınordu 14–1 Antalya İlk Işık (1927, Quarter finals)
 12, Balıkesir 12–0 Kütahya Gençlerbirliği (1927, Quarter finals)
 12, Fenerbahçe 12–0 Adapazarı İdman Yurdu (1933, Group stage)
 12, Harp Okulu 10–2 Trabzon Lisesi (1942, Final group)
 12, Harp Okulu 11–1 Mersin İdman Yurdu (1944, Final group)

Unbeaten champions
Only the period from 1942 to 1951 is considered, as the Turkish championship was held as a knockout tournament before the 1942 edition. The following teams won the Turkish championship in a so called final group, which was a national play-off of the top regional leagues:
Harp Okulu (1942)
Fenerbahçe (1944)
Gençlerbirliği (1946)
Ankara Demirspor (1947)
Ankaragücü (1949)
Beşiktaş (1951)

National Division (1937–1950) 
Records and statistics in this section refer to the former National Division that was held from 1937 to 1950.

Club records

Titles

 Most titles: 6
 Fenerbahçe

 Most consecutive titles: 2
 Fenerbahçe (1945, 1946)

Individual records

All-time top scorers

All-time most appearances

Turkish Cup

Club records

Finals
 Most wins: 18
 Galatasaray (1963, 1964, 1965, 1966, 1973, 1976, 1982, 1985, 1991, 1993, 1996, 1999, 2000, 2005, 2014, 2015, 2016, 2019)
 Most consecutive titles: 4
 Galatasaray (1963, 1964, 1965, 1966)
 Most consecutive appearances: 4
 Galatasaray (1963, 1964, 1965, 1966 - winning all)
 Trabzonspor (1975, 1976, 1977, 1978 - winning two)
 Galatasaray (1993, 1994, 1995, 1996 - winning two)
 Most appearances: 23
 Galatasaray (1963, 1964, 1965, 1966, 1969, 1973, 1976, 1980, 1982, 1985, 1991, 1993, 1994, 1995, 1996, 1998, 1999, 2000, 2005, 2014, 2015, 2016, 2019)
 Biggest win:
 Gençlerbirliği 5–0 Eskişehirspor (1987)
 Most goals in a final: 8
 Antalyaspor 3–5 Galatasaray (2000)
 Most goals by a losing side: 3
 Antalyaspor 3–5 Galatasaray (2000)
 Most defeats in a final: 11
 Fenerbahçe (1963, 1965, 1989, 1996, 2001, 2005, 2006, 2009, 2010, 2016, 2018)

Scorelines
 Biggest home win
 14–2, İskenderun Demir Çelikspor vs Fidan Gençlik, Round 2, 1980–81
 Biggest away win
 1–10, Uşak Belediyespor vs Denizli Belediyespor, Round 2, 2012–13

Unbeaten
 Longest unbeaten run: 26
 Galatasaray, 1962–63 to 1/4 Finals 2nd leg 1966–67 vs Altay

Individual records

Players
 Most Turkish Cup wins: joint record
 6, Bülent Korkmaz: 1991, 1993, 1996, 1999, 2000, 2005 (all with Galatasaray)
 6, Hakan Şükür: 1988 (Sakaryaspor), 1993, 1996, 1999, 2000, 2005 (Galatasaray)

Managers
 Most Turkish Cup wins: joint record
 3, Gündüz Kılıç, 1963, 1965, 1966 (all with Galatasaray)
 3, Ahmet Suat Özyazıcı, 1977, 1978, 1984 (all with Trabzonspor)
 3, Aykut Kocaman, 2012, 2013 (Fenerbahçe), 2017 (Konyaspor)
 3, Fatih Terim, 1999, 2000, 2019 (all with Galatasaray)

TFF Super Cup

Club records
 Most wins: 16
  Galatasaray (1966, 1969, 1972, 1982, 1987, 1988, 1991, 1993, 1996, 1997, 2008, 2012, 2013, 2015, 2016, 2019)
 Most appearances: 25
 Galatasaray (1966, 1969, 1971, 1972, 1973, 1976, 1982, 1985, 1987, 1988, 1991, 1993, 1994, 1996, 1997, 1998, 2006, 2008, 2012, 2013, 2014, 2015, 2016, 2018, 2019)
 Most consecutive wins: 5
 Trabzonspor (1976, 1977, 1978, 1979, 1980)
 Most consecutive appearances: 7
 Beşiktaş (1989, 1990, 1991, 1992, 1993, 1994, 1995)
 Biggest win:
 Galatasaray 3–0 Ankaragücü (1972)
 Beşiktaş 3–0 Fenerbahçe (1974)
 Trabzonspor 3–0 Altay (1980)
 Galatasaray 3–0 Fenerbahçe (1996)
 Trabzonspor 3–0 Bursaspor (2010)

Individual records

Managers
Most Turkish Super Cup wins: 5
 Ahmet Suat Özyazıcı: 1976, 1977, 1978, 1980, 1983 (all with Trabzonspor)
 Fatih Terim: 1996, 1997, 2012, 2013, 2019 (all with Galatasaray)

Players
Most Turkish Super Cup wins: 6
 Şenol Güneş: 1976, 1977, 1978, 1979, 1980, 1983 (all with Trabzonspor)
 Turgay Semercioğlu: 1976, 1977, 1978, 1979, 1980, 1983 (all with Trabzonspor) 
 Necati Özçağlayan: 1976, 1977, 1978, 1979, 1980, 1983 (all with Trabzonspor) 
 Selçuk İnan: 2010 (Trabzonspor), 2012, 2013, 2015, 2016, 2019 (Galatasaray)

The double 
Four teams have won the Double of the Süper Lig and the Turkish Cup.

Most successful clubs overal 
local and lower league organizations are not included.

The figures in bold indicate the most times this competition has been won by a Turkish team.
Balkans Cup is not considered a UEFA competition, and hence clubs' records in the Balkans Cup are not considered part of their European record.

Most successful managers overall (1959–present) 

 The figures in bold represent the most times this competition has been won by a manager.

Süper Lig all-time table (1959–present) 
The overall performances of 73 participant football clubs since the establishment of Süper Lig in 1959 are as follows: In this ranking 3 points are awarded for a win, 1 for a draw, and 0 for a loss, although the Süper Lig awarded 2 points for a win until the 1987–88 season.

Overall league positions (1959–2022)
The overall list of league positions of 73 participant football clubs since the establishment of Süper Lig in 1959 are as follows:

Attendances

See also 
Süper Lig
List of Süper Lig top scorers
List of Turkish football champions

References

External links 
RSSSF
Turkish Football Federation 

Records
Turkey
Records